Relocation Relocation Australia is an Australian lifestyle television series that first aired on The LifeStyle Channel on 28 September 2011. It is hosted by Bryce Holdaway and Veronica Morgan.

References

External links
 

2011 Australian television series debuts
Australian non-fiction television series
Lifestyle (Australian TV channel) original programming